Events from the year 1517 in Ireland.

Incumbent
Lord: Henry VIII

Events
 Gerald FitzGerald, 9th Earl of Kildare, called a Parliament in Dublin

Births

Deaths

References

 
1510s in Ireland
Ireland
Years of the 16th century in Ireland